Martha Betz Shapley (1890–1981) was an American astronomer known for her research on eclipsing binary stars.

Early life
Shapley was born on August 3, 1890 in Kansas City, Missouri, one of seven children of school music teacher Carl Betz (1854–1898) and his wife. Her family were descendants of German immigrants, and her grandfather once told her that he had seen astronomer Caroline Herschel in the streets of Hanover in Germany. Her mother and two sisters became schoolteachers, and Shapley herself became a schoolteacher at age 15. Three years later, she began her studies at the University of Missouri, where she earned a bachelor's degree in education, a second bachelor's degree, and a master's degree, in 1910, 1911, and 1913, respectively. She became a member of Phi Beta Kappa.

She became a high school mathematics teacher in 1912, and soon afterwards began working towards a doctorate in German literature at Bryn Mawr College in Pennsylvania. In 1914, she left the program to marry Harlow Shapley, an astronomer who had been a fellow student with her in Missouri.

Astronomical research
Shapley moved with her husband to the Mount Wilson Observatory and Harvard College Observatory, and from 1915 through 1927 she continued to publish research on eclipsing binary stars, despite not having any formal academic appointment. This was a topic which her husband had previously studied as a graduate student but had moved on from; Zdeněk Kopal has speculated that (as she was the more talented in mathematics of the two Shapleys) she provided significant anonymous assistance to her husband in his doctoral work. Eventually, the pressure of family life caused her to set aside her work in this area.

War service and security investigation
During World War II, in order to contribute to the war effort, Shapley applied to work for the civil service doing cryptanalysis, a subject she had previously studied, but was unable to find a position doing this in Boston.
Instead, she began working with Zdeněk Kopal calculating tables of munitions trajectories. After the war, when senator Joseph McCarthy and the House Un-American Activities Committee began investigating her husband for his left-leaning political views, she came under fire as well, and in 1950 after she was discovered to have brought home data from Kopal on eclipsing binary stars she was relieved of her military work and of her security clearance. However, her clearance was restored and she was allowed to resume her work several months later.

Later life
Shapley's husband retired in 1952, and the couple moved to New Hampshire, but Shapley continued her work on eclipsing binaries. In 1956, with Kopal, she published her last major work, Catalogue of the Elements of Eclipsing Binaries. After her husband's death in 1972, she moved again, to Arizona. She died on January 24, 1981.

Her daughter Mildred Shapley Matthews also became a noted astronomer, her son Willis Shapley became an administrator at NASA, and another son Lloyd Shapley became a Nobel-prize-winning mathematician and economist.

References

1890 births
1981 deaths
American people of German descent
Physicists from Missouri
Scientists from Missouri
Mathematicians from Missouri
American women astronomers
University of Missouri alumni